Cinq-Mars' Farewell to Marie d'Entraigues (French - Les Adieux de Cinq-Mars à Marie d'Entraigues) or The Kiss Goodbye (le Baiser du départ) is a painting by Claudius Jacquand in 1836, which is kept at the Musée des beaux-arts de Lyon.

History
Henri Coiffier de Ruzé d'Effiat, Marquis of Cinq-Mars (1620 - 1642), was a "favourite" of King Louis XIII. After plotting against Cardinal Richelieu he was tried and decapitated with his comrade de Thou in the Place des Terreaux, Lyon.

In 1826, Alfred de Vigny published a historical novel inspired by this event, entitled Cinq-Mars ou Une conjuration sous Louis XIII (French: Cinq-Mars or A Spell on Louis XIII), which piqued the interest of historical painters. In 1829, Paul Delaroche produced Richelieu et Cinq-Mars remontant le Rhône (Richelieu and Cinq-Mars embark on the Rhône) and in 1835 Claude Jacquand displayed a first work, Cinq-Mars et de Thou, depicting the two men being led to their execution, in the Salon. In 1836, Jacquand presented a new work to the Salon, initially entitled Le baiser du départ, after the first chapter of de Vigny's novel.

Description
The composition is inspired by the famous balcony scene from Shakespeare's Romeo and Juliet.

Legacy
Jacquand continued his series of paintings on this theme with Cinq-Mars rendant son épée à Louis XIII (Cinq-Mars Presents his Sword to Louis XIII) and with two further works Cinq-Mars à Perpignan (Cinq-Mars at Perpignan) and Cinq-Mars allant au supplice (Cinq-Mars Going to his Execution), which were displayed in the Salon in 1837.

The scene in Les Adieux de Cinq-Mars à Marie d'Entraigues was reproduced in a more serious form by Charles Vogt in 1853.

In 2014, it was displayed at the Musée des beaux-arts de Lyon as part of the exhibition L'invention du Passé. Histoires de cœur et d'épée 1802-1850.

References

Bibliography

History paintings
1836 paintings
French paintings
Paintings in the collection of the Museum of Fine Arts of Lyon